Lednevo is a rural locality (a station) in Krasnoselskoye Rural Settlement, Yuryev-Polsky District, Vladimir Oblast, Russia. The population was 11 as of 2010.

Geography 
It is located 15 km east from Yuryev-Polsky.

References 

Rural localities in Yuryev-Polsky District